Artturi Nyyssönen (1 May 1892 – 7 September 1973) was a Finnish footballer. He competed in the men's tournament at the 1912 Summer Olympics.

References

External links
 

1892 births
1973 deaths
Finnish footballers
Finland international footballers
Olympic footballers of Finland
Footballers at the 1912 Summer Olympics
Footballers from Helsinki
Association football forwards